This page is a chronological summary of the 2010 Summer Youth Olympics, the inaugural Youth Olympic Games, held in Singapore.

Calendar

Pre-Games 
2001
 International Olympic Committee (IOC) president Jacques Rogge announced plans for an Olympic Games for youths aged 14 to 18.

July 2007
 IOC members at the 119th IOC session in Guatemala City, Guatemala ratified the proposal for the Youth Olympic Games, the first of which would be held in 2010.
 Bidding for the 1st Summer Youth Olympics in 2010 was opened to the National Olympic Committees (NOCs).

21 January 2008
 A postal vote by the International Olympic Committee Executive Board io the week before saw Moscow and Singapore being shortlisted to host the Games, defeating the three other candidates, Athens, Bangkok and Turin.

21 February 2008
 Singapore won the bid to host the first Youth Olympic Games, winning finalist Moscow with a vote of 53 to 44 by International Olympic Committee members.

2 August 2008
 The first Youth Olympic Village was moved from the National University of Singapore's University Town to the campus of Nanyang Technological University, with SYOGOC citing rising construction costs.

21 November 2009
 The official mascots of the Games, Lyo and Merly, were announced. They were introduced by Minister for Community Development, Youth and Sports Dr Vivian Balakrishnan at Suntec City in Singapore.

30 May 2010
 Everyone, the official theme song of the Games, written by local producer Ken Lim and sung by five artistes from the five continents, premiered worldwide.

23 July 2010
 The first ever Youth Olympic Flame was lit in Ancient Olympia, Greece, beginning the round-the-world journey spanning the five continents up till 5 August.

5 August 2010
 The Youth Olympic Flame (JYOF) arrived in Singapore ahead of the Games to be held nine days later. The torch will travel for six days around the island country.

Games 
12 August 2010
 The girls' football preliminary round was the first sport to begin, commencing before the opening ceremony.

Day 1 (August 14) 
Opening ceremony''
 The Olympic cauldron was lit by Singaporean sailor Darren Choy, signalling the commencement of the inaugural Youth Olympic Games.

Day 2 (August 15) 
Triathlon
 Yuka Sato of Japan won the first ever gold medal at the Youth Olympic Games, in the girls' triathlon event.

Day 3 (August 16) 
Taekwondo
 Host nation Singapore received its first medal at the Youth Olympics when taekwondo exponent Daryl Tan entered the semi-finals, virtually guaranteeing him a bronze medal at the least.

Day 4 (August 17) 
Weightlifting
 Chinese weightlifter Deng Wei won the women's 58-kilogram event, setting a new junior world record in the process.

Day 5 (August 18)

Day 6 (August 19) 
Archery
 Korean archer Kwak Ye-ji broke the outdoor junior women's world record with a score of 670 in the 70m (72 arrows) ranking round, breaking the previous record of 666 set compatriot Um Hye-Rang in 2001, and was three points away from the Olympic record set by Ukrainian Lina Herasymenko.

Day 7 (August 20)

Day 8 (August 21)

Day 9 (August 22)

Day 10 (August 23)

Day 11 (August 24)

Day 12 (August 25)

Day 13 (August 26) 
Closing ceremony held at The Float@Marina Bay.

Post-Games

See also 
 Chronological summary of the 2010 Winter Olympics

References

External links 
 Singapore 2010 - official site
 Schedule/Results - Singapore 2010 official site

2010 Summer Youth Olympics
2010